The Cartagena uprising took place 4–7 March 1939 during the Spanish Civil War. The troop transport  was sunk during the revolt.

Background 
After the fall of Catalonia in February 1939, the military situation of the Republic was hopeless. The Republic still held the capital city and 30 per cent of Spanish territory, but the Spanish Republican Army had lost 220,000 soldiers, the second city of the country and the Catalan war industry. Furthermore, on 27 February Manuel Azaña the president of the Republic resigned and the United Kingdom and France recognized the Francoist government. The high commanders of the Republican army believed that further military resistance was impossible, but the prime minister, backed by the Communist Party of Spain (PCE), wanted to continue resistance. Colonel Segismundo Casado, supported by generals Matallana and Miaja, the CNT (Cipriano Mera), the secret service of the republic (the SIM), a section of the Spanish Socialist Workers' Party (PSOE) (Julian Besteiro) and a section of the UGT (Wenceslao Carrillo), planned a coup d'etat against Negrin.

The uprising 
On 3 March, Juan Negrin appointed Francisco Galán, a member of the PCE, to command the naval base of Cartagena. On 4 March, Francisco Galán arrived in Cartagena to take over command and the supporters of Casado, led by the colonel Gerardo Armentia, revolted and arrested Galán. Then, the Fifth Column in the city, led by Colonel Arturo Espa, joined the rebellion, seized the coastal batteries of Los Dolores and the radio station, from where they broadcast appeals for help from the nationalists.  Rafael Barrionuevo, a retired general living in the city, proclaimed himself military governor.

The flight of the Republican Fleet and the suppression of the uprising 
On 5 March, the Nationalist air force bombed the harbour of Cartagena, sinking Spanish Republican Navy destroyer . As a result, Commander Miguel Buiza ordered the bulk of the fleet, which included cruisers Miguel de Cervantes, Libertad and Mendez Nuñez, as well as eight destroyers, to flee from Cartagena and head to Bizerte.

Galán, who had been liberated by the rebels, fled on board Libertad. Then the IV division of the Spanish Republican Army, led by communist officer Joaquim Rodríguez, was dispatched to Cartagena by Jesus Hernandez in order to crush the revolt. On 7 March, the 206th brigade arrived to Cartagena, crushed the rising and seized the radio station and the coastal batteries. There were 61 deaths.

The sinking of Castillo de Olite 
Franco had ordered troops to Cartagena in order to support the uprising, and the same day, two Nationalist transport ships arrived to support the rebellion, without knowing that the rebellion had been crushed. The shore batteries of Cartagena fired at close range and sunk one of them, . 1,225 soldiers died and 700 were taken prisoners.

Aftermath 
The rebellion was crushed, but the Republican fleet didn't return to Cartagena and fled to Bizerte. The French authorities interned the ships and later handed them over to the Nationalists. Without the fleet the evacuation of Republican refugees was impossible.

See also 

 List of Spanish Republican military equipment of the Spanish Civil War
 List of Spanish Nationalist military equipment of the Spanish Civil War

Notes

References 
Beevor, Antony. The battle for Spain. The Spanish civil war, 1936-1939. Penguin Books. 2006. London. .
Thomas, Hugh. The Spanish Civil War. Penguin Books. 2001. London.

Further reading 
Viñas, Ángel; and Hernández Sánchez, Fernando. El Desplome de la República. Editorial Crítica. Barcelona. 2009. 

Battles of the Spanish Civil War
1939 in Spain
Conflicts in 1939
History of Cartagena, Spain
March 1939 events